Corso (قورصو in Arabic) is a city in Boumerdès Province, Algeria located 25 km east of Algiers. According to the 2008 census, this town has a population of 20,705.

Localities 
The municipality is composed of two main cities, the city of Corso (chief town), and the agglomeration of Berrahmoune and several secondary agglomerations like Traykia, Haouch Mahfoud Ben Abdelkader, and Ouled Ben Bakhta.

History
 First Battle of the Issers (1837)

Notable people

References

Communes of Boumerdès Province
Boumerdès Province